Shelter Afrique (SAf), also known as Company for Habitat and Housing in Africa, is a pan-African finance institution created to exclusively support the development of the African real estate and housing sector.  Through its strategic partnerships, it offers products and related services which support the efficient delivery of commercial real estate and affordable housing.

Locations
The main offices of the organisation are located at Shelter Afrique Centre on Longonot Road, Upper Hill, in Nairobi, the capital of Kenya.

The organisation also has two regional offices: one in Abuja, Nigeria's capital city at 1129, Muhktar El-Yakub's Place, Central Business District; and another in Abidjan, Côte d’Ivoire, located at Riviera 3, Carrefour Mel Theodore, Boulevard Arsène Usher Assouan.

History 
Shelter Afrique was established by a Constituent Charter in 1982, and incorporated in Kenya under the Shelter-Afrique Act, chapter 493C of the Laws of Kenya. Operations begun officially in 1985.

Overview
As of December 2020, Shelter Afrique being a supranational development financial institution had total assets valued at approximately US$174.61 million, and shareholders' equity of about US$133.66 million. Besides using its own funds, SAf collaborates with other financial institutions which provide funding for onward lending in the real estate and housing arena within the continent. Partner funding sources include:
(a) Netherlands Development Finance Company (b) French Development Agency (c) European Investment Bank and (d) Commercial Bank of Africa. SAf also works in collaboration with several international organizations with similar objectives, namely: 1. International Union of Housing Finance (IUHF) 2. Centre for Affordable Housing Finance in Africa (CAHF) and 3. UN Habitat for A Better Urban Future (UN-Habitat).

Membership 
Shelter Afrique’s current shareholding comprises 44 member African countries  (‘Class A’ Shareholders) plus 3 institutions; the African Development Bank (AfDB), African Reinsurance Corporation (Africa-Re) and the African Solidarity Fund (FSA) categorised as ‘Class B’ Shareholders.

Shareholders
The organization has 44 member African countries and two African financial multinational institutions:

Governance
Kiiza Bichetero, a national of Uganda, serves as the Chairman of the Board of Directors.  Kingsley Muwowo, the CFO, is the current Acting Managing Director, effective 17 February 2022. The immediate former Managing Director was Andrew Chimphondah, a national of Zimbabwe. In August 2022, Thierno Habib Hann was confirmed as head of Shelter Afrique (SHAF) to replace Zimbabwean Andrew Chimphondah sacked by the board..

Accreditations

ISO Certification 
Shelter Afrique received ISO (International Organization for Standardization) 9001:2015 certification for Quality Management Systems from Bureau Veritas Certification Holding SAS (UK Branch), accredited by United Kingdom Accreditation Service (UKAS) Management System.

This certification was issued in 2020, is valid for three years until 2023, and supports strengthening of the institution’s governance framework.

Bloomfield Rating 
Shelter Afrique retained its Bloomfield Long Term Credit Rating at BBB+, which was issued in 2020.

See also
 Common Market for Eastern and Southern Africa
 PTA Bank
 African Development Bank
 East African Development Bank

References

External links
Shelter Afrique In KSh790 Million (US$9 Million) Deal With Uganda Firm
 Shelter Afrique, FG to deliver 10,000 affordable houses in six months – Afolayan
Shelter Afrique Eyes Nigerian Market to Raise Cash for Lending

International organizations based in Africa
International development in Africa
Economy of Africa
Multilateral development banks
Development finance institutions
Real estate in Africa